List of Glasgow Warriors rugby union players is a list of people who have played for Glasgow Warriors from 1996 - 1997 season to present.

This list only includes players who have played in a competitive match for the professional club in the tournaments listed below. Other professional players for the club can be found in the broader :Category:Glasgow Warriors players.

Players who played for Glasgow in their amateur period (1872-1996), when known as Glasgow District, can be found in the :Category:Glasgow District (rugby union) players.

Numbers given are the official 'Warriors Numbers' assigned to their players.

A player's nationality shown is taken from the nationality at the highest honour for the national side obtained; or if never capped internationally their place of birth. Senior caps take precedence over junior caps or place of birth; junior caps take precedence over place of birth. A player's nationality at debut may be different from the nationality shown. Combination sides like the British and Irish Lions or Pacific Islanders are not national sides, or nationalities.

Players in BOLD font have been capped by their senior international XV side as nationality shown.

Players in Italic font have capped either by their international 7s side; or by the international XV 'A' side as nationality shown.

Players in normal font have not been capped at senior level.

A position in parentheses indicates that the player debuted as a substitute. A player may have made a prior debut for Glasgow Warriors in a non-competitive match, 'A' match or 7s match; these matches are not listed.

Tournaments where competitive debut made:

Crosshatching indicates a jointly hosted match.

References

Glasgow Warriors